John Douglas (1830–1911) was an English architect based in Chester, Cheshire. His designs included new churches, alterations to and restoration of existing churches, church furnishings, new houses and alterations to existing houses, and a variety of other buildings, including shops, banks, offices, schools, memorials and public buildings. His architectural styles were eclectic, but as he worked during the period of the Gothic Revival, much of his work incorporates elements of the English Gothic style.  Douglas is probably best remembered for his incorporation of vernacular elements in his buildings, especially half-timbering. Of particular importance is Douglas' use of joinery and highly detailed wood carving.

Douglas was born in the Cheshire village of Sandiway and was articled to the Lancaster architect E. G. Paley, later becoming his chief assistant.  He established an office in Chester in either 1855 or 1860, from where he practised throughout his career. Initially he ran the office himself but in 1884 he appointed his assistant, Daniel Porter Fordham, as a partner.  When Fordham retired in 1897, he was succeeded by Charles Howard Minshull. In 1909 this partnership was dissolved and Douglas ran the office alone until his death in 1911.  As his office was in Chester, most of his work on houses was in Cheshire and North Wales, although some was further afield, in Lancashire, Merseyside, Greater Manchester, Warwickshire, Herefordshire, Worcestershire, Derbyshire, Surrey, and Scotland.

From an early stage in his career, Douglas attracted commissions from wealthy and powerful patrons, the first of which came from Hugh Cholmondeley, 2nd Baron Delamere. His most important patrons were the Grosvenor family of Eaton Hall, namely Richard Grosvenor, 2nd Marquess of Westminster, Hugh Grosvenor, 1st Duke of Westminster, and Hugh Grosvenor, 2nd Duke of Westminster. Douglas designed a large number and variety of buildings in the family's Eaton Hall estate and the surrounding villages. Other important patrons were William Molyneux, 4th Earl of Sefton, Rowland Egerton-Warburton of Arley Hall, George Cholmondeley, 5th Marquess of Cholmondeley, and Francis Egerton, 3rd Earl of Ellesmere. Later in his career Douglas carried out commissions for W. E. Gladstone and his family, and for W. H. Lever.

Douglas' new houses embrace a range of sizes and types, and include substantial country houses, such as Oakmere Hall and Abbeystead House; cottages, such as the pair known as Tai Cochion; workers' houses, such as those in Port Sunlight; and terraces of houses built for speculation, including 6–11 Grosvenor Park Road and 1–11 and 13 Bath Street in Chester. Work carried out on grand houses included additions to Vale Royal Abbey and Hawarden Castle. Works associated with houses include entrance gates for Mostyn Hall and a set of kennels at Croxteth Hall. Many of Douglas' new houses have been designated as listed buildings. Listed buildings are divided into three grades according to their importance. This list consists of work carried out by Douglas in designing new houses, additions and modifications to pre-existing houses, and structures related to houses such as kennels and gates. The details have been taken mainly from the Catalogue of Works in the biography by Edward Hubbard. Not all structures in these categories are included. If a building is listed, it has been included. Some unlisted buildings have been included because they are of interest, or they demonstrate that Douglas worked in areas at a distance away from his office in Chester. The works excluded are, on the whole, small houses, cottages and outbuildings.  Works attributed to Douglas by Hubbard on stylistic grounds together with evidence of a local association, even though they are not confirmed by other reliable evidence, are included. Where this is the case, it is stated in the Notes column. Unexecuted schemes are not included.

Key

Houses and associated buildings

See also

List of new churches by John Douglas
List of church restorations, amendments and furniture by John Douglas
List of non-ecclesiastical and non-residential works by John Douglas

References
Citations

Sources

External links

 Houses
Douglas, John
Houses, Douglas, John
Houses, Douglas, John